Emil František Burian (11 June 1904 – 9 August 1959) was a Czech poet, journalist, singer, actor, musician, composer, dramatic adviser, playwright and director.  He was also a longtime  activist in the Communist Party of Czechoslovakia.

Early life and career 
Burian was born in Plzeň, Czechoslovakia, where he came from a musical family. His father, Emil Burian, was an opera singer. E. F. Burian himself is the father of singer and writer Jan Burian. He studied under the tutelage of J. B. Foerster at Prague Conservatory, whence he graduated in 1927, but had begun participating in cultural life much sooner. Along with Karel Teige and Vítězslav Nezval, E. F. Burian was a key member of Devětsil, an association of Czech avant-garde artists in the 1920s. 

In 1926–1927 he worked with Osvobozené divadlo, but after disputes with Jindřich Honzl, he and Jiří Frejka left the theatre. Later they founded their own theatre, Da-Da. He also worked with the Moderní studio theatre scene. In 1927 he founded the musical and elocutionary ensemble Voiceband.

In 1923 Burian joined the Communist Party of Czechoslovakia. His work, strongly influenced by communist ideas, bordered on political agitation. In May 1933 he founded the D 34 theatre, with a strongly leftist-oriented program.

Life in concentration camps 

In 1941 Burian was arrested and spent the rest of World War II in Nazi concentration camps at the Small Fortress Theresienstadt, Dachau and finally in Neuengamme. He helped to organize illegal cultural programs for the inmates. In 1945, he survived the RAF attack against the prison ship Cap Arcona, and returned to Czechoslovakia, where he was already presumed dead.

Post-war period 

After the war, he founded D 46 and D 47 theatre, and led theatres in Brno and the operetta house in Karlín. After the communist putsch in 1948, he worked as a member of the Czechoslovak communist parliament. In the post-war period, he became one of the leading promoters of the communist cultural nomenclature. He attempted to reorganize theatres, with a goal of placing communists into leadership posts of theatres.

Burian died in 1959 in Prague.

Work 
His work, deeply influenced by dadaism, futurism and poetism, was leftist-oriented. After the war it proved to agitate Communist ideas. He had a strong influence on Czech modern theatre, and his innovative staging methods (work with metaphor, poetry, and symbols) and inventions (theatergraph, voiceband) are inspirational for the theatre even now.

References

Further reading 
Česká divadla. Encyklopedie divadelních souborů. Prague: Divadelní ústav, 2000. 
Čeští skladatelé současnosti. Prague: Panton, 1985.

External links 
English info
Encyclopedia.com article

1904 births
1959 deaths
20th-century Czech dramatists and playwrights
20th-century Czech poets
Czech composers
Czech male dramatists and playwrights
Czech film directors
Czech male poets
Czech Communist poets
Czech Communist writers
Czech communists
Dada
Socialist realism writers
Actors from Plzeň
Musicians from Plzeň
Writers from Plzeň
Communist Party of Czechoslovakia politicians
Members of the National Assembly of Czechoslovakia (1948–1954)
People from the Kingdom of Bohemia
Prague Conservatory alumni
Dachau concentration camp survivors
Neuengamme concentration camp survivors
Theresienstadt Ghetto survivors
Communist Party of Czechoslovakia members